The 2020 National Hurling League was the 89th season of the National Hurling League for county teams.

Division 1 was restructured in 2020 into two groups of approximately equal strength.

The league was originally scheduled to end on 29 March 2020. The public health measures introduced to combat the COVID-19 pandemic in Ireland resulted in most of the final stages being delayed to October and the Division 1 final stage being reduced from five games to one.

Eir Sport and RTÉ provide live TV coverage of the league on Saturday nights. TG4 broadcast Sunday afternoon games. The highlights programmes are RTÉ2's League Sunday on Sunday evenings, TG4's GAA 2020 on Monday evenings and Eir Sport's Allianz Leagues Reloaded on Wednesday evenings.

Limerick were the winners, defeating Clare in the final on 25 October.

Format

League structure

Thirty-five teams compete in the 2020 NHL –
 twelve teams organised in two six-team groups of approximately equal strength in Division 1
 six teams in Divisions 2A, 2B and 3A
 five teams in Division 3B.
All thirty-two county teams from Ireland take part. London, Lancashire and Warwickshire complete the lineup.

Each team plays all the other teams in their division once, either home or away. Two points are awarded for a win, and one for a draw.

The Division 1 semi-finals had been proposed to finish on the day the games are played avoiding the need for replays. If a semi-final is level after the initial seventy minutes, still level after two ten minute periods of extra time played each way, and still level after two further five minute periods of extra time, the outcome is to be decided by a free-taking competition. This is intended to prevent games from going to a replay and allow the league finals to be held on the scheduled date.

Tie-breaker
 If only two teams are level on league points, the team that won the head-to-head match is ranked ahead. If this game was a draw, score difference (total scored minus total conceded in all games) is used to rank the teams.
 If  three or more teams are level on league points, score difference is used to rank the teams.

Finals, promotions and relegations

Division 1
The top team in each group qualifies for the NHL final. (Originally, the group winner would have advanced to the semi-finals, and the second- and third placed team in each group qualify for the NHL quarter-finals)
 The bottom team in each group meet in a relegation play-off, with the losers being relegated to Division 2A
Division 2A
 The top two teams meet in Division 2A final, with the winners being promoted to Division 1
 The bottom team is relegated to Division 2B
Division 2B
 The top two teams meet in Division 2B final, with the winners being promoted to Division 2A
 The bottom two teams meet in a relegation play-off, with the losers being relegated to Division 3A
Division 3A
 The top two teams meet in Division 3A final, with the winners being promoted to Division 2B
 The bottom team is relegated to Division 3B
Division 3B
 The top two teams meet in Division 3B final, with the winners being promoted to Division 3A

Division 1

Division 1 Format

The top twelve teams compete in Division 1 in two six-team groups of approximately equal strength based on their league performance in 2019. This group structure was introduced in 2020. (Previously the top six ranked teams were in Division 1A and the teams ranked 7–12 were in Division 1B.)

Each team play all the other teams in their group once. Two points are awarded for a win and one for a draw. The top team in each group qualifies for the league final. The last-placed team in each group plays in the relegation playoff with the losers being relegated to Division 2A.

Division 1 Group A

Division 1 Group A Table

Division 1 Group A Rounds 1 to 5

Division 1 Group A Round 1

Division 1 Group A Round 2

Division 1 Group A Round 3

Division 1 Group A Round 4

Division 1 Group A Round 5

Division 1 Group B

Division 1 Group B Table

Division 1 Group B Rounds 1 to 5

Division 1 Group B Round 1

Division 1 Group B Round 2

Division 1 Group B Round 3

Division 1 Group B Round 4

Division 1 Group B Round 5

Division 1 Final

This game was also the 2020 Munster quarter-final.

Division 1 relegation play-off

The bottom teams in the two Division 1 groups meet in a play-off with the losers being relegated to Division 2A.

Division 1 scoring statistics

Top scorers overall

Top scorers in a single game

Division 2A

Division 2A Table

Division 2A Rounds 1 to 5

Division 2A Round 1

Division 2A Round 2

Division 2A Round 3

Division 2A Round 4

Division 2A Round 5

Division 2A Final

Division 2A scoring statistics

Top scorers overall

Top scorers in a single game

Division 2B

Division 2B Table

Division 2B Rounds 1 to 5

Division 2B Round 1

Division 2B Round 2

Division 2B Round 3

Division 2B Round 4

Division 2B Round 5

Division 2B Final

Division 2B relegation play-off

Division 3A

Division 3A Table

Division 3A Rounds 1 to 5

Division 3A Round 1

Division 3A Round 2

Division 3A Round 3

Division 3A Round 4

Division 3A Round 5

Division 3A Final

Division 3B

Division 3B Table

Division 3B Rounds 1 to 5

Division 3B Round 1

Division 3B Round 2

Division 3B Round 3

Division 3B Round 4

Division 3B Round 5

Division 3B Final

References

External links
Full Fixtures and Results

 
National League
National Hurling League seasons